Heswall Football Club is an association football club based in Heswall, Merseyside, England. The club is a FA Charter Standard Club affiliated to the Cheshire Football Association.

History

The club was founded in 1891. In the early years the club played in Division two of the West Cheshire Association Football League from the 1894–95 season until the end of the 1910–11 season, winning the division once in the 1906–07 campaign, but not gaining promotion to Division One.

In 1958 the club rejoined Division Two of the West Cheshire League, finishing as runners-up at their first attempt. The club remained in Division Two until the end of the 1968–69 season, when they earned promotion to Division One as champions. The club remained in Division one until  the end of the 1981–82 season, when they left the league. Just a few seasons before this the club made its debut in the FA Vase in the 1978–79 season, but getting knocked out immediately by Linotype F.C. in the preliminary qualify round. They did better the following season, making it to the 3rd round, a feat they would repeat a further two times.

The 1988–89 season saw the club return to Division one of the West Cheshire League, and the 2004–05 season saw the club become champions of the league. The club repeated this feat in the 2012–13 season, but they were relegated the following season. They bounced back up as runners-up of Division two at their first attempt, to return to Division one. The club stayed in Division one for three seasons, being relegated back to Division Two, when they had a 15 point deduction for failing to play 5 games.

In 2020, Heswall FC merged clubs with new club Pensby FC under the Heswall FC name.

In an interrupted 2020 - 2021 season, Heswall finished in 2nd Place in Division 2 to make a well deserved return to the top flight, a fantastic achievement from the squad and the management team of Andy Cass, Ben Scoffield & Jake Cripps. 

The first season back in the top division saw Heswall perform superbly, finishing in 5th place. Sadly, at the end f the season, Manager Andy Cass chose to step down to take up a post at Vauxhall Motors taking his players & coaches with him. Heswall brought in Neil Young & Paul Mort to rebuild the first team but sadly things didn't go to plan and they stepped down in November with coach Neil Sharpe stepping up to be First Team Manager with Aaron Baird as his assistant. www.heswallfc.co.uk

Ground

Since 1971 the club has played its home games at Gayton Park. In 2020, a number of renovations have taken place at the ground.

Honours 
West Cheshire Association Football League
 Division One Champions (7) 1935 - 1936, 1936 - 1937, 1937 - 1938, 1984 - 1985, 1987 - 1988, 2004 - 2005, 2012 - 2013
 Division Two Champions (6) 1906 - 1907, 1968 - 1969, 1989 - 1990, 1990 - 1991, 1996 - 1997, 1998 - 1999
Cheshire Football Association Amateur Cup 
 Winners (2) 1991–92 & 2011–1
Wirral District FA Senior Cup
Winners (7) 1938 - 1939, 1984 - 1985, 1991 - 1992, 1995 - 1996, 1996 - 1997, 1997 - 1998, 1998 - 1999
 Wirral District FA Amateur Cup
 Winners (10) 1931 - 1932, 1932 - 1933, 1933 - 1934, 1935 - 1936, 1936 - 1937, 1976 - 1977, 1986 - 1987, 1995 - 1996, 1998 - 1999, 2003 - 2004
 Wirral District FA Junior Cup
 Winner (1) 1919 - 1920
 Pyke Cup
 Winner (4) 1932 - 1933, 1938 - 1939, 1984 - 1985, 1996 - 1997
 Bill Weight Trophy
 Winner (1) 1991 - 1992
 West Cheshire League Bowl Sponsored by Haworth & Gallagher
 Winner (3) 1989 - 1990, 1998 - 1999, 2020 - 2021
 West Cheshire League Development Trophy
 Winner (1) 2015 - 2016

Notable players 

Alan Reeves played for Heswall during the 1987–88 season and later went on to make over 400 appearances for Football League clubs including Wimbledon F.C. and Swindon Town. Reeves' brother Dave Reeves, also spent a season with Heswall before beginning his career with Sheffield Wednesday. Graham Branch had a stellar career with Tranmere Rovers & Burnley.

References

External links
Official website

Football clubs in England
Football clubs in Merseyside
1891 establishments in England
Association football clubs established in 1891
West Cheshire Association Football League clubs